The Young Count (German: Der junge Graf) is a 1935 Czech-German comedy film directed by Carl Lamac and starring Anny Ondra, Hans Söhnker and Fritz Odemar. It is set around the circus, part of a subgenre of Circus films. It was shot at the Tempelhof Studios in Berlin. The film's sets were designed by the art directors Wilhelm Depenau and Erich Zander.

Cast

References

Bibliography 
 Bock, Hans-Michael & Bergfelder, Tim. The Concise CineGraph. Encyclopedia of German Cinema. Berghahn Books, 2009.
 Klaus, Ulrich J. Deutsche Tonfilme: Jahrgang 1935. Klaus-Archiv, 1988.

External links 
 

1935 films
1935 comedy films
German comedy films
Films of Nazi Germany
1930s German-language films
Films directed by Karel Lamač
UFA GmbH films
Circus films
German black-and-white films
Czechoslovak comedy films
Czechoslovak black-and-white films
1930s German films
Films shot at Tempelhof Studios